Miloš Malović (born 1 April 1989) is a Serbian football defender.

Born in Belgrade, Serbian capital, he started playing in the youth team of the powerhouse Red Star Belgrade. Between 2007 and 2011 he spent most of the time on loans, first at Red Stars farm team FK Sopot, and later in second level sides FK Srem and FK Napredak Kruševac. In summer 2012 he joined FK Zemun, coming from OFK Mladenovac where he spent the previous half season.

References

1989 births
Living people
Footballers from Belgrade
Serbian footballers
FK Srem players
FK Sopot players
Red Star Belgrade footballers
FK Napredak Kruševac players
OFK Mladenovac players
FK Zemun players
Association football defenders
Serbian First League players